Anna Margrethe Schall, (17 September 1775 – 24 November 1852), was a Danish ballerina. She was one of the most notable ballet dancers in Denmark.

Early life and education
Margrethe Schall was the daughter of the sailor Rasmus Schleuther and Anna Kirstine Mortensdatter. She became a student in the theatre school of Det Kongelige Teater in Copenhagen in 1787.

Career

She became a star of the Danish ballet of Vincenzo Galleotti. She was not described as beautiful or technically skillful, but was rather admired for her expressfull mimique, which made her perfect for the style of the Galeotti Ballet, and for her swiftness, and she became known as a so-called "grotesque dancer", within comedy ballet. She was made solo dancer in 1798. In 1802, she made her greatest success on stage. She was active in her profession longer than most dancers, and retired in 1827.

Personal life
She married violinist Andreas Schall (1772–1810) in 1795 and divorced him in 1796. Margrethe Schall was also known for her love relationship with Prime Minister Fredrik Julius Kaas.

She died on 24 November 1852 and is buried in Copenhagen's Assistens Cemetery.

References 

 Dansk Kvindebiografisk Leksikon - Margrethe Schall

Literature 
 Robert Neiiendam: To kvinder i H.C. Andersens liv, 1954. 
 Svend Kragh-Jacobsen (red.): Den kongelige danske ballet, 1952. 
 August Bournonville: Mit Theaterliv, 1848–78. 
 Thomas Overskou: Den danske Skueplads 1854–76.

1775 births
1852 deaths
Danish ballerinas
Royal Danish Ballet dancers
18th-century Danish ballet dancers
19th-century Danish ballet dancers
Burials at Assistens Cemetery (Copenhagen)